Claire Chandler (born 1 June 1990) is an Australian politician who was elected as a Senator for Tasmania at the 2019 Australian federal election. She is a member of the Liberal Party.

Personal life
Chandler grew up in the Huon Valley and attended St Michael's Collegiate, a Hobart private school for girls. She studied Arts/Law at the University of Tasmania where her interest in politics was furthered. At university she was a member of the University of Tasmania Liberal Club where she met her future husband Chris Edwards. Chandler later joined the Young Liberals and served as both the Tasmanian Division President, and Federal President.

Politics
As Young Liberal President, Chandler led an internal review of the Tasmanian Division of the Liberal Party gender imbalance. Following the report, Chandler described the party's engagement with women as "sobering", but rejected the idea of gender quotas as a solution to fix the divide.

Chandler stood as a candidate for the seat of Franklin at the 2018 Tasmanian state election. She was preselected in the second position on the Liberal Party's Senate ticket in Tasmania on 9 September 2018, and was elected to the Senate at the 2019 federal election, for a term beginning on 1 July 2019. At the time, aged 29, Chandler was Australia's youngest female senator.

Political positions
Chandler is a member of the National Right faction of the Liberal Party.

Chandler has been described as a conservative. She is a supporter of a conscience vote for members of parliament on euthanasia, but does not support any changes to the law as it currently stands in Tasmania. Chandler also campaigns against the use of anti-discrimination laws and tax-payer funds to suppress free speech by those she calls "the woke".

Chandler is against the expansion of transgender rights. As an ardent campaigner for women's "sex-based rights", she advocates that women's sports, women's toilets, and women's change rooms are designed for, and should be reserved for, people of the female sex. 
In June 2021, Chandler appeared at an online event alongside Walt Heyer, an American de-transitioned activist who has called gender reassignment surgery a "modern-day frontal lobotomy".

Chandler criticised the attendance of 43 year old transgender weightlifter Laurel Hubbard at the 2020 Summer Olympics. Chandler argued that the International Olympic Committee's decision to allow Hubbard to compete in women's events had displaced 18 year old Roviel Detenamo who had stood to become the first female Nauruan Olympian in 20 years and exemplified "why it's so unfair to female athletes to allow males into their categories". In February 2022, Chandler introduced the Sex Discrimination and Other Legislation Amendment (Save Women's Sport) Bill 2022 to the Parliament of Australia.

References

External links
Australian Parliament House biography

1990 births
Living people
University of Tasmania alumni
21st-century Australian politicians
21st-century Australian women politicians
Women members of the Australian Senate
Liberal Party of Australia members of the Parliament of Australia
Members of the Australian Senate for Tasmania
Members of the Australian Senate